Verticordia oxylepis, commonly known as bonsai featherflower, is a flowering plant in the myrtle family, Myrtaceae and is endemic to the south-west of Western Australia. It is a small shrub, often with a layered appearance, small leaves and very small yellow and pink flowers.

Description

Flowering time is from October to January.

Taxonomy and naming
Verticordia oxylepis was first formally described by Nikolai Turczaninow in 1852 from a specimen collected by James Drummond. The description was published in Bulletin de la Classe Physico-Mathématique de l'Académie Impériale des Sciences de Saint-Pétersbourg. The specific epithet (oxylepis) is derived from the Ancient Greek words oxys meaning "sharp" or "acute" and lepis meaning "a scale", probably in reference to the pointed sepals.

When Alex George reviewed the genus Verticordia in 1991, he placed this species in subgenus Verticordia, section Infuscata along with V. longistylis.

Distribution and habitat
This verticordia grows in sandy clay, in exposed rocky areas and in heath. It occurs in the area between the Gairdner River and Hopetoun in the Esperance Plains, Avon Wheatbelt, and Mallee biogeographic regions.

Conservation
Verticordia oxylepis is classified as "Not Threatened" by the Western Australian Government Department of Parks and Wildlife.

Use in horticulture
Bonsai featherflower is a very slow growing plant. It has been propagated from both cuttings and from seed, and have been grown in a range of soils where they have proven to be hardy in full sun.

References

oxylepis
Rosids of Western Australia
Eudicots of Western Australia
Plants described in 1857
Taxa named by Nikolai Turczaninow